Tomás Herrera Martinez (21 December 1950 – 18 October 2020) was a  basketball player from Cuba, who won the bronze medal with the men's national team at the 1972 Summer Olympics in Munich, West Germany.

Career
Martinez was born in Santiago de Cuba on 21 December 1950. During the 1979 Pan-Am Games, he broke Kyle Macy's jaw with an intentional elbow; while he was ejected from the game, he was not banned from the Games, despite having earlier assaulted another player.  He was also involved in an incident during the 1973 World University Games vs. the United States National Team.

Martinez died on 18 October 2020 at the age of 69.

References

databaseOlympics
sports-reference

1950 births
2020 deaths
Sportspeople from Santiago de Cuba
Cuban men's basketball players
1970 FIBA World Championship players
1974 FIBA World Championship players
Basketball players at the 1972 Summer Olympics
Basketball players at the 1976 Summer Olympics
Basketball players at the 1980 Summer Olympics
Olympic bronze medalists for Cuba
Olympic medalists in basketball
Basketball players at the 1971 Pan American Games
Basketball players at the 1979 Pan American Games
Pan American Games bronze medalists for Cuba
Medalists at the 1972 Summer Olympics
Olympic basketball players of Cuba
Pan American Games medalists in basketball
Medalists at the 1971 Pan American Games